Sowdari or Sodri is a district of North Kordofan state, Sudan. Its population was 271,465 in 2008.

References

Districts of Sudan